Sky Italia S.r.l. is an Italian satellite television platform owned by the American media conglomerate Comcast. Sky Italia also broadcasts three national free-to-air television channels: TV8, Cielo and Sky TG24. As of 2018, following an agreement with Mediaset, Sky Italia also operates a series of subscription-based terrestrial channels offering sports, entertainment, and movies. Sky Italia is also the major sports broadcaster in Italy.

Pay TV services on Sky Italia satellite platform are encrypted in NDS VideoGuard.

History
Sky Italia was founded on 31 July 2003 by the merger of TELE+ and Stream TV.

Sky Italia uses the Hot Bird 13B satellite at 13.0°E.

On 28 June 2010, Sky Italia changed its brands and logos, making them identical to the BSkyB ones.

On 1 October 2010, Sky activated its first 3D channel, Sky Sport 3D, available without any extra cost to the Sport pack subscribers. The very first event Sky Sport 3D aired was the 2010 Ryder Cup. On 25 December 2010, Sky launched another 3D channel: Sky Cinema 3D, airing 3D movies, available for free for Cinema pack subscribers. These channels have been replaced by Sky 3D on 6 September 2011, then closed on 16 January 2018.

Tom Mockridge, the then head of Sky Italia replaced Rebekah Brooks as chief executive of News International after she had resigned on 15 July 2011.

Andrea Zappia replaced Tom Mockridge as CEO on 1 August 2011. On 7 October 2011 Sky Italia announced it reached the 5 million subscribers benchmark.

Following News Corporation's split into two on 28 June 2013, to create two separate companies, 21st Century Fox (the re-branded News Corporation), and the spin-off company New News Corp, the 100% stake held by News Corporation in Sky Italia was retained by the re-branded 21st Century Fox.

Following media speculation, on 12 May 2014 Sky Italia's sister company, BSkyB, confirmed that it was in talks with its largest shareholder, 21st Century Fox, about acquiring 21st Century Fox's 57.4% stake in Sky Deutschland and its 100% stake in Sky Italia. The enlarged company would be likely to be called "Sky Europe" and it will consolidate 21st Century Fox's European digital TV assets into one company. The sale was announced on 25 July 2014 which was subject to regulatory and shareholder approval. The acquisition was completed on 13 November.

In 2016, Sky Italia created Vision Distribution, a film distribution venture with five Italian production companies: Wildside (owned by Fremantle), Cattleya (backed by ITV Studios), Lucisano Media Group, Palomar and Indiana Production. Since the beginning of August 2019, Universal Pictures, Sky's corporate cousin via NBCUniversal, handles theatrical distribution for Vision's releases in Italy. On 20 January 2020, Vision launched their own international sales arm, Vision Distribution International.

Since October 2018, Sky Italia, as well as Sky UK, Sky Ireland and Sky Deutschland, is controlled by Comcast.

On 1 October 2019, Maximo Ibarra replaces Andrea Zappia as CEO. Maximo Ibarra however left Sky Italia already on 30 June 2021. 

On 16 June 2020, Sky Italia launched Sky Wifi, its ultra-broadband service.

On 6 September 2021 Andrea Duilio Started as the new CEO of Sky Italia.

Timeline

1998 
December: Miro Allione, Stream's CEO, stated that News Corp signed a preliminary deal with Telecom Italia to buy 80% of Stream, but the introduction of a bill limiting the acquisition of soccer pay TV rights has made the company reconsider its plans.

1999 
April: 35% of Stream is acquired by News Corp.

2002 
June: TelePiù is acquired by News Corp.

2003 
March: the European Commission approves the merger between TELE+ and Stream TV.
31 July: Sky Italia is founded. At the same day, Sky TG24 is launched as a rolling news channel.

2004 
April: Sky Italia abandons SECA encryption system to switch to the NDS, managed by the News Corporation.
1 August: Sky launches weather news channel, Sky Meteo 24.
November: Sky's subscribers reach 3 million.

2005 
May: Sky Italia are awarded the broadcast rights to the 2006 FIFA World Cup.
November: Sky Italia launches the My Sky decoder with PVR functionality.

2006 
May: Sky launches its first high definition channels: Sky Cinema HD, Sky Sport HD, National Geographic Channel HD and Next:HD.
December: Sky's subscribers reach 4 million.

2007 
April: Fox airs the first TV drama created by an Italian pay television channel, Boris.
May: Sky are awarded the broadcast rights for Formula One for two and a half years.
May: Cooltoon anime programming is launched.
November: A selection of Sky channels become available via IPTV on Telecom Italia, Fastweb and Wind.

2008 
February: Sky are awarded the broadcast rights for the 2012 Summer Olympics.
May: Sky launches My Sky HD.
30 August: Sky launches sport news channel, Sky Sport 24.
December: VAT on subscriptions is increased from 10% to 20%.

2009 
January: Sky are awarded the broadcast rights for the FIFA Confederations Cup and the Six Nations Championship.
April: Sky launches Sky Uno and Sky Primafila HD.
August: Sky increases its high-definition offering to 12 channels.
September: Sky announces the Sky Digital Key, a USB Key with terrestrial decoder functions.
December:
Sky On Demand service launches.
Sky launches free-to-air channel Cielo.

2010 
January: All Serie A matches begin transmitting in high-definition.
April: Sky launches three Sky Movies channels in high-definition, bringing the total number of HD channels to 25 channels.
June:
Sky changes its brand identity with a new logo, similar to that used by BSkyB.
Mondiali 1–4 launch for the 2010 FIFA World Cup.
August: The number of high-definition channels reaches 36.
October: The 2010 Ryder Cup final is the first sport event to be broadcast in 3D.
November:
Sky's subscribers reach 4.8 million.

2011 
January: Avatar is the most watched film on Italian pay TV, with an audience of 1.3 million viewers.
February: Sky are awarded the broadcast rights for the 2011 Copa América, 2011 and 2012 Copa Sudamericana and 2012 Copa Libertadores.
March: Sky Cinema Passion and Sky Cinema Comedy launch.
May: Sky are awarded the broadcast rights for X Factor.
August: Sky launches Sky Go, an app which allows a number of Sky channels to be viewed on smartphones and tablets.
September: Sky launches Sky 3D, the first 3D channel in Italy.
October:
Sky's subscribers reach 5 million.
Sky Uno begins broadcasting in HD for the premiere of X Factor.
December:
Sky's HD channels reach 40 with the launch of Eurosport 2 HD.

2012 
February:
12 new HD channels are launched, Fox Life HD, Real Time HD, Extreme Sports Channel HD, ESPN America HD, Discovery Science HD, Discovery Travel & Living HD, History HD, Nat Geo Wild HD, Nat Geo Adventure HD, Gambero Rosso Channel HD, Disney Channel HD and MTV Live HD, bringing the total number of HD channels to 52.
Sky changes the operating system of My Sky HD.
March: Sky Go becomes free and is made available for PC, OS X, iPhone and Android.
May: Sky are awarded the broadcast rights for the Grand Prix motorcycle racing for the 2014, 2015, 2016, 2017 and 2018 seasons of MotoGP, Moto2 and Moto3 series.
June:
Sky are awarded the broadcast rights for the Formula One and its feeder series (GP2, GP3 and Porsche Supercup) for the 2013, 2014 and 2015 seasons, with an option for the 2016 and 2017 seasons.
The launch of Sky Arts is announced.
July:
Sky updates the On Demand service.
Sky are awarded the broadcast rights for the UEFA Champions League for the 2012–13 and 2013–14 seasons.
Sky adds 12 extra channels for the 2012 Summer Olympics.
August: Sky's subscribers reach 4.9 million.
September:
Sky TG24 receives an on-screen rebrand.
Sky adds two more high definition channels: DeA Sapere HD and Disney XD HD.
October: Planet Kids, a new channel for kids, is launched.
November:
1: Sky Arts launches in HD, bringing the total number of HD channels to 58.
Sky Go is updated to include three more channels and Sky On Demand.

2013 
February: Sky's subscribers fall to 4.83 million.
March: Sky are awarded the broadcast rights for the Bundesliga for two seasons. Sky launches the Sky Sport F1.
3 April: Cielo launches in HD.
May: Sky's subscribers fall to 4.78 million.
July: Sky are awarded the broadcast rights for 2014 Winter Olympics, but transfers the rights for the 2016 Summer Olympics to RAI.
9 August: Fox Sports launches on Sky and Mediaset Premium, broadcasting the Premier League, the FA Cup, La Liga and Ligue 1.
September: Sky TG24 launches in high-definition, bringing the total number of HD channels to 63.
October: Classica and MTV launches in high-definition, bringing the total number of HD channels to 65.
November: Sky's subscribers fall to 4.76 million.
December: Sky Go launches on Windows Phone.

2014 
February: Sky are awarded the broadcast rights for Italia's Got Talent and the UEFA Europa League for 3 seasons.
10 March: Sky Sport MotoGP launches.
9 April: Sky Atlantic launches, broadcasting American, Italian and European TV series.

2015 
August: Sky are awarded the broadcast rights for the Lega Basket Serie A for 2 seasons.
December: Sky are awarded the broadcast rights for the Premier League for the 2016–17, 2017–18 and 2018–19 seasons.

2016 
May: Sky are awarded the broadcast rights for the EuroBasket 2017, EuroBasket Women 2017, 2018 FIBA Women's Basketball World Cup, 2019 FIBA Basketball World Cup, EuroBasket Women 2019, EuroBasket 2021, AfroBasket 2021, AmeriBasket 2021, 2021 FIBA Asia Cup and EuroBasket Women 2021.
October:
Sky are awarded the broadcast rights for the NBA for the 2016–17 and 2017–18 seasons.
Sky's subscribers rise to 4.67 million.
November: Cartoon Network HD is launched, bringing the number of HD channels to 66.

2017 
June:
 Sky are awarded the broadcast rights for the 2017 FIFA Confederations Cup.
 Sky are awarded the broadcast rights for the UEFA Champions League and UEFA Europa League for the 2018/19, 2019/20 and 2020/21 season, and for the 2018, 2019 and 2020 UEFA Super Cup.
November: Sky launches Sky Q Platinum.

2018 
April: Mediaset Premium's cinema channels start broadcasting on Sky.
June: Mediaset Premium's TV series channels start broadcasting on Sky.
July: Channel logos became identical to the Sky UK ones. Sky launches Sky Q Black.
December: Sky's subscribers reach to 5,2 million.

2019 
February: Discovery Travel & Living and Animal Planet close.
July: Mediaset Premium's TV series channel Premium Joi close.
September: Sky launches Sky Q Fiber.
October: Disney XD, Disney in English, Fox Animation, Fox Comedy and Nat Geo People close.

2020 
May: Bike Channel, Disney Channel, Disney Junior, Teennick, MTV Rocks and MTV Hits close.
July: Fox Life, Lei, Dove TV and Man-ga close.
September: 
Due to the COVID-19 pandemic, Sky's subscribers fall to 4,6 million.
The logos became identical to the Sky UK ones.
December: GINX Esports TV close.

2021 
July: Fox Crime and Roma TV close and Sky Documentaries, Sky Investigation, Sky Nature and Sky Serie are launched.

2022 
January: Premium Action, Premium Stories, Premium Crime, Premium Cinema, Paramount Network and Spike close.
July: Fox close.
October: National Geographic, National Geographic Wild and Baby TV close and Lazio Style Channel is upgraded to HD.

Sky HD and 4K HDR

Sky HD is the brand name of the HDTV service launched by Sky Italia on 20 April 2006 in Italy – during the 2006 FIFA World Cup – to enable high definition channels on Sky Italia to be viewed. The service requires the user to have a Sky Box HD (distributed by Sky Italia), and an HDTV with HDCP enabled.

A HD PVR decoder called My Sky HD was launched on 26 May 2008 (on 20 December 2008 was sold a particular edition designed by Fendi in favour of the international organisation Child Priority).

On 29 November 2017, Sky launched Sky Q Platinum, a set-top box enabled to view programmes in 4K HDR and to use the multiscreen wireless service.

On 2 July 2018, Sky launched Sky Q Black, a set-top box identical to the Sky Q Platinum which enables the 4K HDR service but not the multiscreen wireless.

Here are the channels available in HD:

Logos

Channel Packs
Sky Italia offers a range of channels that are grouped into: 
 Sky TV – Entertainment, TV series, Eurosport's sport, news, documentaries and music;
Entertainment plus – Adds Netflix to the Sky TV package;
Sky Cinema – Movies;
 Sky Sport and Sky Calcio (Football) – Sports and football;
Sky Kids – cartoons.

Sky TV 
 Rai 1
 Rai 2
 Rai 3
 Rete 4
 Canale 5
 Italia 1
 La7
 Sky Uno (Sky One, +1 available)
 Sky Serie (+1 available)
 Sky Atlantic (+1 available)
 Crime+Investigation
 Sky Arte (Sky Arts, +1 available)
 TV8
 Blaze
 Comedy Central (+1 available)
 MTV
 La EFFE
 Classica
 NOVE
 20 Mediaset
 Cielo
 27 Twentyseven
 La5
 Real Time
 Mediaset Extra
 Giallo
 TOPcrime
 Sky Investigation (+1 available)
 DMAX
 Mediaset Italia 2
 Eurosport 1
 Eurosport 2
 Horse TV
 Gambero Rosso Channel
 Food Network
 HGTV
 Sky TG24 (Sky News Italy)
 Sky TG24 Primo Piano
 Sky Meteo 24 (Sky Weather 24)
 Sky News
 Mediaset TGCom24
 MTV Music
 VH1
 Discovery Channel (+1 available)
 National Geographic (+1 available)
 Discovery Science
 History (+1 available)
 Sky Documentaries (+1 available)
 Sky Nature (+1 available)
 Focus
 Motor Trend
 Super!
 K2
 Frisbee
 Rai Gulp HD

Sky Kids 
 DeA Kids (+1 available)
 Nick Jr. (+1 available)
 Nickelodeon (+1 available)
 Cartoon Network (+1 available)
 Boomerang (+1 available)
 DeA Junior

Sky Sport and Sky Calcio 
 Sky Sport 24 (Sky Sports News)
 Sky Sport Uno
 Sky Sport Serie A
 Sky Sport Football
 Sky Sport Arena
 Sky Sport Collection
 Sky Sport NBA
 Sky Sport F1
 Sky Sport MotoGP
 Roma TV
 Sky Sport (channels from 251 to 263)

Sky Cinema
 Sky Cinema Uno (+24 available)
 Sky Cinema Due (+24 available)
 Sky Cinema Collection
 Sky Cinema Family
 Sky Cinema Action
 Sky Cinema Suspense
 Sky Cinema Romance
 Sky Cinema Drama
 Sky Cinema Comedy
 Iris
 Cine34

Optional Channels 
 DAZN 1
 DAZN 1+
 Milan TV
 Inter TV
 Lazio Style Channel
 Torino Channel
 Caccia e Pesca
 Doctor's Life Channel

References

External links
 
 Sky Italia on Comcast

 
2003 establishments in Italy
Telecommunications companies established in 2003
Italia
Direct broadcast satellite services
Italian-language television networks